Events from the year '''2021 in Pakistan.

Incumbents

National government

Provincial governments

Events

January and February 
 2 January
 23 year-old Usama Satti was shot to death in his car by Islamabad Police.
 Zakiur Rehman Lakhvi was arrested in Lahore, on terrorism-financing charges.
 3 January - Machh attack
 5 January - The Supreme Court ordered that the Shri Paramhans Ji Maharaj Samadhi temple in Teri, Karak District, be rebuilt by the government after it was destroyed by a mob in December 2020.
 9 January – A massive blackout strikes Pakistan, leaving as much as 90 percent of the country without electricity at its height as officials rush to restore power.
 11 January - 9 countries appointed new ambassadors to Pakistan: Nepal, Tapas Adhikari; Belarus, Andrei Metdlitsa; South Korea, Sush Sangpyo; Cuba, Zener Javier; Mali, Dianguinadit Yaya Doucoure; Ireland, Ms Sonya McGuinness; Sierra Leone, Alie Kamara; Cambodia, Ung Sean; Kosovo, Ilir Dugolli.
 12 January - Two gunmen attacked a team of polio vaccine handlers in Karak, Khyber Pakhtunkhwa, killing a policeman who was escorting them.
 28 January – A Malaysian court ordered the immediate release of Pakistan International Airlines (PIA) plane which was seized on 15 January, at the Kuala Lumpur International Airport, over a lease dispute.
 22 February - Ippi shooting

March and April 
 21 March – Janikhel protest
 24 March - 2021 Chaman bombings
 11 April - 20 April - 2021 Pakistani protests
 21 April - Quetta Serena Hotel bombing

May and June 
 21 May - 2021 Chaman bombings
 31 May - May 2021 Balochistan attacks
 7 June - 2021 Ghotki rail crash
 23 June - 2021 Lahore bombing

July and August
 14 July - Dasu bus attack
 21 July - Raghagan Dam incident
 25 July - 2021 Azad Kashmiri general election
 28 July - 2021 Islamabad flooding
 8 August - Pakistan at the 2021 Islamic Solidarity Games
 9 August - August 2021 Quetta bombing
 12 August - Pakistan Ordnance Factories explosion
 14 August - Karachi grenade attack
 17 August - Vandalism of Maharaja Ranjeet Singh's statue in Lahore
 20 August - Gwadar suicide attack
 26 August - August 2021 Balochistan attacks

September and October 
 5 September - 2021 Quetta suicide attack
 7 October - 2021 Balochistan earthquake
 22 October - October 2021 Tehreek-e-Labbaik Pakistan protests

November and December 
 3 November - Azad Kashmir bus incident
 8 November - West Indies women's cricket team in Pakistan in 2021–22
 28 November - Charsadda arson attack
 3 December - Lynching of Priyantha Kumara
 17 December - Eighth Extraordinary Session of the Islamic Summit Conference
 19 December - 2021 Khyber Pakhtunkhwa local elections

Arts

Cinema

Economy 
 2020–21 Pakistan federal budget
 2021–22 Pakistan federal budget

Deaths

January

March 
 1 March - Ejaz Durrani, Pakistani film actor

April 
 2 April - Shaukat Ali, Pakistani singer.

July 
 1 July - Anwar Iqbal

July 
 14 July - Mamnoon Hussain, 12th President of Pakistan (b. 1941)
 16 July - Sultana Zafar
 17 July - Naila Jaffri, Pakistani actress.

February 
18 February - Mushahid Ullah Khan, Pakistani politician

August 
 12 August - Durdana Butt

October 
 2 October - Umer Shareef
 10 October - Abdul Qadeer Khan, Father of Pakistan's nuclear program

November 
 1 November - Farooq Qaiser
 13 November - Sohail Asghar

See also

Country overviews
 Pakistan
 History of Pakistan
 History of modern Pakistan
 Outline of Pakistan
 Government of Pakistan
 Politics of Pakistan
 Years in Pakistan

Related timelines for current period
 2021
 2021 in politics and government
 2020s
 21st century

References

 
Pakistan
Pakistan
2020s in Pakistan
Years of the 21st century in Pakistan